Luigi Olivetti (Revere, Lombardy, November 19, 1856  – Tivoli, January 28, 1941) was an Italian painter, both in oil and watercolor, and engraver. His secular birth name was Luigi Giacomo Angelo.

In 1883, a Rome, exhibited a watercolor titled: Città, and in 1884 at Turin, at the National Exhibition he exhibited Cecilia la Guida delle Catacombe; La figlia del Borgomastro, and Ricordi of the Brettagna. He painted the genre painting: Ragazza sullo sfondo di Tivoli.

He was a resident of Rome, and late in life, moved to Tivoli with his wife Mariannina Palma.
He is buried in Rome in the  Verano Monumental Cemetery.

References

1856 births
1940s deaths
19th-century Italian painters
Italian male painters
20th-century Italian painters
Artists from the Province of Mantua
19th-century Italian male artists
20th-century Italian male artists